The Act of Consecration to the Sacred Heart of Jesus are two Roman Catholic prayers, one composed by Saint Margaret Mary Alacoque and the other composed by Blessed Mary of the Divine Heart Droste zu Vischering. It was a part of the private revelations reported by the two mystical nuns regarding the Sacred Heart of Jesus.

Words of the prayer of Saint Margaret Mary Alacoque 

To the Sacred Heart of Jesus, I give myself and consecrate to the Sacred Heart of our Lord Jesus Christ, my person and my life, my actions, pains and sufferings, so that I may be unwilling to make use of any part of my being other than to honor, love and glorify the Sacred Heart. This is my unchanging purpose, namely, to be all His, and to do all things for the love of Him, at the same time renouncing with all my heart whatever is displeasing to Him. I therefore take You, O Sacred Heart, to be the only object of my love, the guardian of my life, my assurance of salvation, the remedy of my weakness and inconstancy, the atonement for all the faults of my life and my sure refuge at the hour of death. 

Be then, O Heart of goodness, my justification before God the Father, and turn away from me the strokes of his righteous anger. O Heart of love, I put all my confidence in You, for I fear everything from my own wickedness and frailty, but I hope for all things from Your goodness and bounty.

Remove from me all that can displease You or resist Your holy will; let your pure love imprint Your image so deeply upon my heart, that I shall never be able to forget You or to be separated from You.

May I obtain from all Your loving kindness the grace of having my name written in Your Heart, for in You I desire to place all my happiness and glory, living and dying in bondage to You. Amen.

Words of the prayer of Blessed Mary of the Divine Heart 

My most loving Jesus, I consecrate myself anew today and without reserve to Your Divine Heart. To You I consecrate my body with all its senses, my soul with all its faculties, and my whole being. To you I consecrate all my thoughts, words, and works; all my sufferings and labors; all my hopes, consolations, and joys; and chiefly I consecrate to You my poor heart that I may love but You and be consumed as a victim in the flames of Your love.

Accept, O Jesus, my most loving Spouse, the desire I have to console Your Divine Heart and to belong to You forever. Take possession of me in such a manner that henceforward I may have no other liberty than that of loving You, no other life than that of suffering and dying for you.

In You I place unbounded confidence, and I hope for pardon of my sins from Your infinite mercy. In Your hands I lay all my cares and principally that of my eternal salvation. I promise to love You and to honor You until the last moment of my life, and to propagate as far as I am able, with the help of Your Divine grace, devotion to Your most Sacred Heart.

Dispose of me, O Divine Heart of Jesus, according to Your good pleasure. I desire no other recompense than Your greater glory and Your holy love.

Grant me the grace to find in Your most Sacred Heart my dwelling place; there I desire to pass each day of my life; there I wish to breathe forth my last sigh. Make also my heart Your abode, the place of Your repose; that so we may remain intimately united until one day I may praise, love, and possess You for all eternity, and sing forever the infinite mercies of Your most Sacred Heart. Amen.

See also
 Sacred Heart of Jesus
 Prayer of Consecration to the Sacred Heart
 Visions of Jesus and Mary
 Alliance of the Hearts of Jesus and Mary
 Consecration of Russia to the Immaculate Heart of Mary

Notes

Sources
 Handbook of Prayers by James Socías, 2006 OSV Press  page 363
 Maria Droste, A translation of …PIU NOBILE PER CARITA by A. Ricciardi. Translated by Frances Warnig, 1996

Catholic adoration of Jesus
Sacred Heart
Catholic theology and doctrine
Christian symbols
Roman Catholic prayers
Sacramentals